"Sticks & Stones" (also written "Sticks and Stones") is a song by British singer/songwriter Arlissa. The song was released on 3 March 2013 as the lead single from her scrapped debut album, Battles. The song was written by Arlissa, Mark Taylor, Patrick Mascall & Jamie Scott. The song peaked at number 48 in the UK Singles Chart on week ending 16 March 2013 and spent 3 weeks in the top 100.

Charts

Metro and Nelly Furtado version

"Sticks & Stones" is the dance version of Nelly Furtado's cover that she recorded for her 2017 album The Ride featuring the British production duo Metro (Brian Rawling and Mark Taylor). Impressed with Metro’s remixes of her song, Furtado rerecorded the vocals from her cover on the new version, giving the single an electro-house feel.

The 2018 version became Furtado's seventh number one and Metro's first on Billboard's Dance Club Songs chart, reaching the summit, as well as reaching number 30 on the Hot Dance/Electronic Songs chart.

Track listing
EP
"Sticks & Stones" (Original) – 3:34
"Sticks & Stones" (F9 Remix Edit) – 3:29  
"Sticks & Stones" (F9 Extended Remix) – 7:20
"Sticks & Stones" (Chrome Tapes Extended Remix) – 5:50
"Sticks & Stones" (Mojito Remix) – 3:47

Remixes
"Sticks & Stones" (StoneBridge & Damien Hall Epic Mix) – 3:23
"Sticks & Stones" (StoneBridge & Damien Hall Epic Extended Mix) – 5:12  
"Sticks & Stones" (StoneBridge & Damien Hall Epic Dubstrumental) – 5:12
"Sticks & Stones" (Bimbo Jones Vocal Mix) – 6:13
"Sticks & Stones" (Bimbo Jones Ibiza Club Mix) – 5:50
"Sticks & Stones" (Manuel Riva & Cristian Poow Remix) – 8:24

Charts

References

External links
Official Video (Metro & Nelly Furtado version) at YouTube

2013 songs
2013 singles 
2018 singles
Arlissa songs
Nelly Furtado songs
Songs written by Mark Taylor (record producer)
Songs written by Jamie Scott
House music songs
Songs written by Arlissa